Arayannam is a 1981 Indian Malayalam film,  directed by P. Gopikumar. The film stars Sukumari, Sathar, Sukumaran and Jagannatha Varma in the lead roles. The film has musical score by Pukazhenthi.

Cast

Sukumari as Nalini's mother
Sathaar as Raghu
Sukumaran as Madhu
Jagannatha Varma as Sekhara Menon
Jalaja as Devi
Madhu Malini as Nalini
Mala Aravindan as Antony
Master Rajeev as Murali
Raji as Radha
Santhakumari as Madhu's mother
Sreenath as Vijayan
T. G. Ravi as Captain Rajan

Soundtrack
The music was composed by Pukazhenthi and the lyrics were written by P. Bhaskaran.

References

External links
 

1981 films
1980s Malayalam-language films
Films directed by P. Gopikumar
Films scored by Pukazhenthi